"Dr. Feelgood" is a 1994 single by Swedish Eurodance band Cool James & Black Teacher. It was released as the lead single from their only album, Zooming You (1994). The song features vocals by singer Anne Haavisto and was a huge hit in Sweden, peaking at number two on the Swedish singles chart. It became the 21st bestselling single of 1994 there.

Critical reception
Pan-European magazine Music & Media commented, "Down at the doctors teenagers get cured with a dose of Euro dance that isn't that much different from the recipe as served by fellow countryman Dr. Alban."

Track listing

Charts

References

1994 singles
1994 songs
Eurodance songs
House music songs
Stockholm Records singles